Benaragama Vidanalage Jagath Champika Benaragama (born June 2, 1972 as ජගත් බෙනරගම) [Sinhala]), popularly as Jagath Benaragama, is an actor in Sri Lankan cinema, television and theater. He is best known for the role Ukkuwa in Paba teledrama and the main protagonist in the critically acclaimed movie Prathiroo.

Personal life
He is married to Renuka Pushpakumari Vithana, and the wedding ceremony was celebrated on 3 July 2010 at Paradise Inn Hotel, Delthawa, Piliyandala. His wife is from Hambantota district and worked in Ceylon Water Board. The couple has one daughter.

Jagath's sister Kokilani Benaragama is married to popular actor Ravindra Yasas. The couple has one son, Kasun Chamara who is also a renowned actor and singer, and started his career with musical the program Hapan Padura.

Acting career
Benaragama started his career with a stage drama directed by Douglas Siriwardena. While acting, he also worked as an officer at the Presidential office. However, after a severe vehicle accident, he resigned from the office, where at that time, he is invited to play in a television serial by V. Sivadasan.

In 2014, Benaragama's character in television serial Pabasara, which was telecast on ITN has been theatrically killed as he is contesting from Sarath Fonseka's party in the election. He stated that this has happened intentionally because the channel is owned by the government and his election party is opposed to that.

Selected stage dramas
 Ransirige Sangramaya
 Meepura Wasiyo
 Thala Mala Pipila
 Guru Tharuva
 Andarela
 Sihina Walata Paatadenna
 Sellam Nirindu

Selected television serials

 Adaraya Ahasa Tharam
 Aparna
 Bhavana - Amuttha
 Brahma Muhurthiya as Rathnaya
 Chalo
 Damsaari
 Dangakara Tharu
 Deyyange Rate
 Diyawadana Maluwa
 Gini Avi Saha Gini Keli
 Hada Pudasuna 
 Hopalu Arana
 Ihirunu Kiri
 Kammiththa
 Kele Handa 
 Maya Dunne 
 Nedeyo
 Nil Nethu
 Nisala Diya Sasala Viya
 Oba Mageya
 Paalam Paaruwa
 Paba as Ukkuwa
 Pabasara
 Parana Tawuma
 Pata Veeduru
 Pathok Paalama
 Purakalani
 Ransirige Sangramaya as Ransiri
 Sanda Nodutu Sanda
 Sansara Sakmana
 Saranganaa
Sasara Ivuru 
 Sithaka Mahima
 Sonduru Sitheththi as Liyana Mahaththaya
 Uthuwankande Sura Saradiyel
 Vasanthaya Avilla 
 Vimukthi
 Vinivindimi

Beyond acting
He has written two scripts, A Heenayata Awasarai and Laa Sanda Paamula. He directed a teledrama titled Sanda Nodutu Sanda.

Benaragama contested from Colombo district for the Western Provincial council elections.

Filmography
 No. denotes the Number of Sri Lankan film in the Sri Lankan cinema.

References

External links

Sinhalese male actors
Living people
Sri Lankan male film actors
1972 births